Events from the year 1800 in Austria

Incumbents
 Monarch – Francis II

Events

 - War of the Second Coalition (1798-1802)
 - Battle of Ampfing (1800)
 - Battle of Biberach (1800)
 - Battles of Stockach and Engen
 - Battle of Erbach

Births

Deaths

References

 
Years of the 19th century in Austria